The 2016 CAA men's soccer tournament, was the 34th edition of the tournament. It determined the Colonial Athletic Association's automatic berth into the 2016 NCAA Division I Men's Soccer Championship.

The Delaware Fightin' Blue Hens won the CAA title, making it their second CAA championship. The Hens defeated the William & Mary Tribe in the championship, 2–1.

Seeding 

The top six programs qualified for the CAA Tournament. The top two seeds, being the regular season champion and runner-up earned a bye to the semifinals of the tournament.

Bracket

References 

CAA Men's Soccer Tournament
Colonial Athletic Association Men's Soccer